Magic Magic 3D is a 2003 Indian Tamil-language children's fantasy film directed by Jose Punnoose. The film stars Suraj Balajee, S. P. Balasubrahmanyam, Tirlok Malik and Pooja Kumar. It was dubbed in Malayalam, Telugu and Hindi, with the Hindi dub being titled as Chota Jadugar. It won the National Film Award for Best Special Effects.

Plot 
Indrajeet lives with his grandfather Acharya , a magician in Mayapuri. The boy's mother died when he was an infant. Acharya teaches him magic, but never sent him to school for formal education. Indrajeet's father Krishna, who runs a successful Indian channel in the United States, arrives up to take his son for education. Indrajeet refuses to leave his grandfather, but is forcibly sent to New York City via carton.

Indrajeet awakens in New York City where he has been brought against his will. He meets his stepmother Deepti, but soon runs away and befriends three runaway orphans and a wonder dog who belongs to Mahesh and Lude, two petty thieves. Meanwhile, Acharya comes to New York City in search of his grandson. Indrajeet gets kidnapped by the thieves, but ultimately Acharya, along with the dog, saves his grandson using all his magic tricks.

Cast 

 Suraj Balajee as Indrajeet
 S. P. Balasubrahmanyam as Acharya
 Tirlok Malik as Krishna, Indrajeet's father
 Pooja Kumar as Deepti, Indrajeet's stepmother
 Mohan Raman as Oor Thalaivar (Village Head)
 Halwa Vasu as servant
 Master Mahendran as one of Indrajit's friends
 Julia Rusastky as Kiki
 Julian Carey as Tyrone
 Justin Melvin as Yogi
 Andrea Alton as Maid
 Al Dioro
 Owen Burke
 Barkley as Romeo the dog

Production 
70% of Magic Magic was shot in New York City. Filming also took place in Manhattan, and to a lesser extent in India. According to Jose, the film took roughly 140 days to complete.

Soundtrack 
The music was composed by Sharreth and Jagan. Lyrics were written by Pa. Vijay and Na. Muthukumar (Tamil), Girish Puthancherry and Mathew Cherian (Malayalam), Vennelakanti and Bhuvanachandra (Telugu) and Sudhakar Sharma (Hindi).
Tamil version
"Kanne Chella" – SPB, K. S. Chithra
"Vanavilil" – priya
"Yaar Indha Kuttichathan" – SPB, priya
"Chandramandalam" – Priya

Hindi version
"Taalido" – SPB, Chithra
"Kaun Hai Yeh" – SPB, Sunidhi Chauhan
"Indradhanush" – Sunidhi Chauhan
"Zoobi Zoobi" – Sunidhi Chauhan

Malayalam version
Kanne Chella – K. J. Yesudas
Aarannu Kuttichathan – SPB, Priya
Kanna Kaattin – Priya
Ambuli Mama – Priya

Reception 
Sify stated that it "is technically tacky, made in a shoddy manner and lacks a basic story line that will not gel with today's children". However, Idlebrain.com said, "Don't forget to take kids along with you. They need to watch this movie more than you!!". The film won the National Film Award for Best Special Effects.

References

External links 
 

2000s children's fantasy films
2000s Tamil-language films
2003 3D films
2003 directorial debut films
2003 films
Films about magic and magicians
Films scored by Sharreth
Films set in the United States
Films shot in New York City
Films shot in the United States
Films that won the Best Special Effects National Film Award
Indian 3D films
Indian children's fantasy films